Swiss–Turkish relations are foreign relations between Switzerland and Turkey. Switzerland has an embassy in Ankara and a consulate-general in Istanbul. Turkey has an embassy in Bern and consulates-general in Zürich and Geneva. Both countries are full members of the Council of Europe, the OECD, the OSCE and the WTO.

Demographics
Approximately 130,000 immigrants from Turkey live in Switzerland, many of them Turkish Kurds.

Espionage
In March 2017, the Swiss Office of the Attorney General launched an investigation into possible surveillance of the Turkish community in Switzerland. Those suspected of conducting the espionage reportedly worked at the Turkish embassy in Bern. The suspects reportedly monitored participants of a political protest at the University of Zurich and attempted to kidnap in 2016 a Swiss-Turkish businessman linked to the Gülen movement in Zürich. Turkish Ambassador Ilhan Saygili denied the allegations.

Resident diplomatic missions 
 Switzerland has an embassy in Ankara and a consulate-general in Istanbul.
 Turkey has an embassy in Bern and consulates-general in Geneva and Zürich.

See also 
 Foreign relations of Switzerland
 Foreign relations of Turkey
  
 List of ambassadors of Switzerland to Turkey
 Turks in Switzerland
 Turks in Europe

References

External links 
 Swiss embassy in Ankara
 Turkish embassy in Bern
 Turkish Ministry of Foreign Affairs about relations with Switzerland

 
Turkey
Bilateral relations of Turkey